Kadhal Munnetra Kazhagam is a 2019 Indian Tamil-language drama film directed by Manicka Sathya. It stars Prithvi Rajan and Chandini Tamilarasan in the lead roles, alongside Singampuli and Ganja Karuppu in supporting roles. Featuring music composed by P. C. Shivan, the film was released on 10 May 2019.

Cast

Production
A period drama set in 1985, the debutant director Manicka Sathya cast Chandini Tamilarasan and Prithvi Rajan in the lead roles. Prithvi was  selected to play a villager who is a fan of the actor Karthik, while Chandini played a school teacher courted by eight men.

The film began production in mid-2016, with Chandini referencing actress Shobana's old films for her character. The shoot of the film took place largely around the Cuddalore district, with a song getting shot in Ooty. As several songs by Ilaiyaraaja were used in scenes during the film, the makers sought permission from the composer to include them. The makers readied the film for release in 2019, several years after the film was completed.

Soundtrack
The film's soundtrack was composed by P. C. Shivan.
"Kadhal Munnetra Kazhagam" - Jayamurthy, Kavitha Gopi
"Rajini Kamalu" - P. C. Shivan
"Onnakanda Nenjukkulla" - Ajaey Shravan, Namitha Babu
"Navvaapazha Kannazhagi" - Anthony Daasan, Priya Subramanian
"Thoduvaanam" - Ganesh Venkataraman, Rita

Release
The film had a low profile opening across Tamil Nadu on 10 May 2019. A critic from The New Indian Express noted "Kadhal Munnetra Kazhagam is not romantic, let alone be progressive" and that "it is just a mish-mash of self-congratulatory messages and nods to the sexism rampant in Tamil films, as though it were something worth cherishing."

References

External links

2019 films
2010s Tamil-language films
Indian romantic drama films
Films set in 1980
2019 romantic drama films